There are several neighborhoods in Plymouth, Massachusetts. With a total area of 134.0 mi² (347.0 km), Plymouth is the largest municipality in Massachusetts by area. In addition, with a population of  51,701 at the 2000 census and an estimated population of 57,901 in 2007, Plymouth is the second-largest town in the state by population (after Framingham. (Framingham is actually now a city making Plymouth the largest town.) As such, Plymouth is home to many distinct neighborhoods and geographical locations.

The most prominent of Plymouth's neighborhoods is Plymouth Center, also referred to as Downtown Plymouth. It is home to Plymouth's town hall and harbor. The geographical regions of North Plymouth, South Plymouth, and West Plymouth are named based upon their relationship to Plymouth Center.

Plymouth has one of the longest coastlines of any town in Massachusetts, and makes up the entire western shore of Cape Cod Bay. The town is therefore home to a wide array of beach communities.

List of neighborhoods

Plymouth Center
Harbor District
North Plymouth
Cordage Park
Saquish Neck (accessible only through Duxbury)
Gurnet Point
Saquish Head
Clark's Island 
West Plymouth
Micajah Heights
Billington Sea
Darby
East Carver (a portion of this section of Carver extends over the town line into Plymouth)
South Pond
Wellingsley (Jabez Corner) 
Chiltonville
Plymouth Beach
South Plymouth
Rocky Point
The Pinehills
Buttermilk Bay
Manomet
Priscilla Beach
White Horse Beach
Manomet Heights
Manomet Bluffs
Fishermans Landing
Churchill Landing
Colony Beach
Pilgrim Beach
Cedar Bushes
Shallow Pond Estates
Manomet Beach
Vallerville
Ocean Aire Beach 
Surfside Beach
Bayside Beach
Ellisville
Harlow’s Landing
Eastland Heights
Cedarville
Nameloc Heights
Pondville
Halfway Pond
Long Pond
West Wind Shores
White Island Shores

See also
Plymouth, Massachusetts

References

 
Plymouth, Massachusetts